Thando Mgqolozana (born 27 August 1983, in Cape Town, South Africa) is a Mandela Rhodes Scholar, a recipient of the Golden Key International Honour for Scholastic Achievement, and one of the Mail & Guardian’s Top 200 Young South Africans of 2010. He has previously worked as a researcher at the Human Sciences Research Council and is now based at the University of Cape Town.

Mgqolozana is the author of Hear Me Alone (2011), A Man Who Is Not a Man (2009), a novel that enjoyed critical success and was long-listed for the International Dublin Literary Award, and Unimportance (2014).

Mgqolozana is the co-writer of Inxeba (The Wound) (2017), an award-winning film, inspired by his novel, A Man Who Is Not A Man, about the Xhosa traditional initiation into manhood.

References

External links 
 Thando Mgqolozana on Books LIVE
 http://www.cca.ukzn.ac.za/index.php/tow-past-participants/79-tow-2015/931-thando-mgqolozana-sou

South African male novelists
1983 births
Living people
21st-century South African novelists
21st-century South African male writers